The 2019–20 season of Flamengo Basketball is the 100th season of the club, and the club's 12th in the Novo Basquete Brasil (NBB). This is the inaugural season of the Basketball Champions League Americas, FIBA Americas League successor. The NBB season was cut short due to the COVID-19 pandemic, ending shortly before the end of the regular season, with no playoffs and consequently, no champions declared.

Offseason

Pre-season

The season

Roster

Depth chart

Technical staff

Transactions

In

|}

Out

|}

Player statistics

NBB

Pre-season and friendlies

NBA G League International Challenge

Group A

Matches

Playoffs

Semifinal

3rd Place

Competitions

2019 Campeonato Carioca

League table

Results summary

Results by round

Matches

Results overview

Campeonato Carioca Final

2019–20 Basketball Champions League Americas

First Stage (Group C)

League table

Results summary

Matches

Playoffs

Matches

2019-20 NBB

League table

Results summary

Results by round

Matches

*Due to a deal with the team's main sponsor, BRB, some home games were played at the city of Brasília

Results overview

2020 Copa Super 8

Matches

References

External links
Official club website 
Flamengo Team Profile at New Basket Brazil 
Flamengo Team Profile at Latinbasket.com 

Flamengo Basketball seasons
Flamengo Basketball